Large brackets in mathematical equations may refer to:
 Interval (mathematics)
 Matrix (mathematics)

Mathematics symbol parentheses 
Parentheses in mathematical equations may refer to:
 Precedence of operators
 Interval (mathematics)
 Matrix (mathematics)
 Argument of a function in mathematical functions 
 A set of coordinates in a coordinate system

Mathematics symbol braces {} 
Braces in mathematical equations {} may refer to:
 Precedence of operators
 Set (mathematics)

Mathematics symbol square brackets [] 
Square brackets in mathematical equations [] may refer to:
 Precedence of operators
 Interval (mathematics)
 Commutator
 Iverson bracket
 Lie bracket of vector fields
 Matrix (mathematics)

Mathematics symbol angle brackets 〈〉 
Angle brackets or chevrons in mathematical equations 〈〉 may refer to:
 Inner product
 Dirac notation (physics)
 Ordered pairs and other tuples in set theory (along with parentheses)
 Moment (mathematics)
 Linear span

See also
Math symbol parentheses (disambiguation)
Math symbol braces (disambiguation)
Math symbol squarebracket (disambiguation)
Math symbol anglebracket (disambiguation)